The Mixed team compound W1 was one of three team events held in 2016 Paralympics archery in Rio de Janeiro. It contained seven teams of one man and one woman, and took place on 17 September 2016, the ranking round having been held on 10 September.

Following a ranking round, the teams ranked 2nd to 7th entered the knockout rounds at the quarterfinal stages, with the highest seeded team entering in the semi final round. The losing semifinalists played off for the bronze medal. Knockouts were decided on an aggregate score basis, with each archer shooting 8 arrows apiece.

Team compound W1

Ranking Round

Competition bracket

References 

M